Red Lion is an unincorporated community located within Southampton Township in Burlington County, New Jersey, United States.

Red Lion is home to the Red Lion Inn, a diner, and a few houses, all located near the Red Lion Circle, within the New Jersey Pine Barrens.

The name, Red Lion, comes from a story about one of the original settlers, a man by the name of Parks, who battled a mountain lion. The lion's coat turned red from its own blood. Mountain lion and black bear were common in the area before being hunted to extinction.

References

Southampton Township, New Jersey
Populated places in the Pine Barrens (New Jersey)
Unincorporated communities in Burlington County, New Jersey
Unincorporated communities in New Jersey